Hot Pants is one of the numerous groups involving the French singer-songwriter of Spanish descent Manu Chao and his cousin, drummer Santi.  As with all of Chao's music, the group had many influences, most notably The Clash, which contributed to their rockabilly sound.  The group sang in English and Spanish. The group released a demo tape in 1984 entitled "Mala Vida," and in 1985 they released a 45 with the single "So many nites" (and B-side "Lover Alone"). They released a full-length album entitled Loco Mosquito in 1986, which was re-released in 2000.

The members of the group were:
Manu Chao: guitar/vocals
Pascal Borgne: guitar
Jean-Marc: bass guitar
Santi: drums

Rockabilly music groups
French punk rock groups